Canyon City is a town located in Canyon Lake, Texas fed by the Guadalupe River in Comal County, Texas, United States, in what is now Canyon Lake.

History
Canyon City is said to be a small town on the Guadalupe River built in the mid-19th century in the Canyon Basin, north of San Antonio. The city is said to be fully intact and the use of SCUBA equipment can allow divers to see the remains of the city that was covered up by the construction of Canyon Dam in 1964. The city is an unverified "Cowboy Tale" that stems from locals who remember the story of the sunken city and the Army Corps of Engineers relocation of Canyon City to what now is Canyon Lake, population 16,870 at the 2000 census.

External links
Chamber of commerce

Former cities in Texas
Geography of Comal County, Texas
Ghost towns in Central Texas